Steven "Steve" Clamp (born 3 January 1976) is an English broadcast journalist and presenter with ITV Central

Career
In 1994 his first television role was as a presenter of a children’s tv series. He began freelancing as a presenter but also worked as a cameraman, editor, presenter and reporter for Chelsea TV. In 1998 he 'transferred' and became a senior reporter for Manchester United TV. In 2000 he began presenting for Sky Sports News and on occasions Sky News; whilst also presenting a weekly phone-in for Manchester United TV.

In January 2002, he joined the BBC West Midlands regional news programme Midlands Today as a senior sports reporter, he also regularly stood in for host Nick Owen.

In May 2005, he moved ITV Central as co-presenter of ITV News Central in the East Midlands. On 20 February 2009 he was made redundant by the station. 

He then freelanced with ITN, appearing on the ITV News at 5:30, ITV News London and Setanta Sports News.

In August 2009 he rejoined ITV News Central as the Sports Correspondent. 

As of 5 July 2022, Clamp is co-presenter of ITV News Central in the East & West Midlands, succeeding Bob Warman.

Filmography

Personal life
Steve Clamp grew up in Havant in Hampshire. His great-grandfather was professional footballer Arthur Clamp, who died of wounds suffered during the course of his service in World War I. His first work in tv came about when he landed a children’s TV show following his first ever screen test. He later moved into entertainment before using his journalism qualifications to move into news and sport, working for Sky sports, Sky News, the BBC, ITN and ITV, both nationally and regionally. On 21 February 2005 the BBC West Midlands regional programme Inside Out revealed that Steve and his then wife had suffered two previous miscarriages. Steve lives in Worcestershire with his second wife, Lindsay, and has three children.

References

External links
Official website
Steve Clamp on Twitter

ITV regional newsreaders and journalists
ITN newsreaders and journalists
English male journalists
English sports broadcasters
English television journalists
British television newsreaders and news presenters
Living people
1976 births